The 2023 UEFA European Under-17 Championship (also known as UEFA Under-17 Euro 2023) is the 20th UEFA European Under-17 Championship (39th edition if the Under-16 era is also included), the annual international youth football championship organised by UEFA for the men's under-17 national teams of Europe. Hungary will host the tournament. A total of 16 teams will play in the tournament, with players born on or after 1 January 2006 eligible to participate.

France, having won the title in 2022 are the title holders.

Host selection
19 April 2021: Selection of successful host associations by the UEFA Executive Committee at its meeting in Montreux

For the UEFA European Under-17 Championship final tournaments of 2023 and 2024, Hungary and Cyprus were selected as hosts respectively.

Qualification

All 55 UEFA nations entered the competition, and with the hosts Hungary qualifying automatically, the other 54 teams will compete in the qualifying competition, which will consist of two rounds: Qualifying round, which will take place in autumn 2022, and Elite round, which will take place in spring 2023, to determine the remaining 15 spots in the final tournament.

Qualified teams
The following teams qualified for the final tournament.

Note: All appearance statistics include only U-17 era (since 2002).

Final draw

Venues
The tournament is hosted in ... venues:

Group stage

The group winners and runners-up advance to the quarter-finals.

Group A

Group B

Group C

Group D

Knockout stage
The schedule for the knockout stage was released on 2023. The top 5 teams in the knockout stage will qualify for the 2023 FIFA U-17 World Cup in Peru as UEFA representatives.

Bracket

Quarter-finals
The quarter-finals will take place on ...

Semi-finals
The semi-finals will take place on ...

World Cup playoffs
The World Cup playoffs will take place on ...

Final

Goalscorers

References

External links

2023
Under-17 Championship
2023 Uefa European Under-17 Championship
2022–23 in Hungarian football
2023 in youth association football
UEFA
UEFA
Sports events affected by the 2022 Russian invasion of Ukraine
Scheduled association football competitions